A work-in is a form of direct action under which workers whose jobs are under threat resolve to remain in their place of employment and to continue producing, without pay. Their intention is usually to show that their place of work still has long-term viability or that it can be effectively self-managed by the workers.

Historical examples 

 1971: Upper Clyde Shipbuilders work-in
 1971: Harco Steel work-in
 1972: Sydney Opera House work-in
 1975: Nymboida coal mine work-in
 1981: BC Telephone work-in

See also
Die-in
Sit-in
Teach-in
Strike action
Workplace democracy
Workers' control

References

Labor relations